This is a list of notable employment websites. An employment website is a web site dealing specifically with employment or careers.

See also
 .jobs, a sponsored top-level domain for employment-related sites.
 Job hunting

Employment